Brian Richard Walter Bradley (born January 21, 1965) is a Canadian former professional ice hockey player. Bradley played for a number of different hockey teams in many different leagues. He played for the London Knights in the early 1980s before being selected 51st overall, in the 3rd round, by the Calgary Flames at the 1983 NHL Entry Draft. Bradley spent a season with the Canadian national team before moving to the National Hockey League (NHL) for good.

Playing career
As a youth, Bradley played in the 1978 Quebec International Pee-Wee Hockey Tournament with a minor ice hockey team from Kitchener, Ontario.

Brian Bradley's NHL debut came in the 1985–86 season with the Calgary Flames, where he saw very limited action (only 5 regular season games and one playoff game), although his first playoff game was during the 1986 Stanley Cup Finals against the Montreal Canadiens. He would spend most of the season with the Moncton Golden Flames (Calgary's minor league team), where he was linemates with future superstar Brett Hull.

In 1988, after arriving back from playing with Canadian National Men's Hockey Team, where he spent most of the 1986–87 NHL season playing, Bradley was traded to the Vancouver Canucks. During the 1989 playoffs, Bradley would tie rookie Trevor Linden with a team-leading 7 points in seven games. His best regular season totals with the Canucks came in the 1989–90 season when he scored a team respectable 48 points and was awarded The Canucks' "Most Exciting Player Award" by Canuck fans. He started out the 1990–91 season playing strongly, only to be traded to the Toronto Maple Leafs for mobile defenceman Tom Kurvers.

In 1992, the expansion Tampa Bay Lightning acquired him in the 1992 NHL Expansion Draft, and he would become the team's first star. He would score the team's first preseason goal against the Minnesota North Stars. He would set personal highs in goals, assists and points before the All-Star Break. At the end of Tampa Bay's inaugural season, Bradley led the team with a career high 42 goals and 86 points. He played well enough throughout the season that he also made his NHL All-Star debut. In 1995–96 he set a personal high of 56 assists. That same year the Lightning debuted in the NHL playoffs. The next season (1996–97) Brian Bradley would score the first goal in the history of the Ice Palace arena. Unfortunately, he would be sidelined for most of the 1997-98 season due to a concussion. He would remain with the Lightning until retiring due to chronic injuries on December 23, 1999.

Post-hockey life
Bradley is still affiliated with the Lightning's organization and makes frequent appearances on Bally Sports Sun television, which broadcasts regular season Lightning games.

On March 29, 2017, Bradley was inducted into the Sports Club of Tampa Bay Hall of Fame as part of the Hall's 34th class. Bradley became the third member of the Lightning organization to be inducted. This is Bradley's second hall of fame induction in that he is also a member of the Waterloo Region Hall of Fame in his hometown of Kitchener, Ontario.

Career statistics

Regular season and playoffs

International

Awards and honours
Selected to two NHL All-Star Games: 1993, 1994
Held the NHL record for most goals scored (42) by a single player in an expansion team's inaugural season from 1993-2018.

References

External links

1965 births
Living people
Calgary Flames draft picks
Calgary Flames players
Canadian ice hockey centres
Colorado Flames players
Ice hockey people from Ontario
Sportspeople from Kitchener, Ontario
Ice hockey players at the 1988 Winter Olympics
London Knights players
Moncton Golden Flames players
National Hockey League All-Stars
Olympic ice hockey players of Canada
Tampa Bay Lightning players
Tampa Bay Lightning announcers
Toronto Maple Leafs players
Vancouver Canucks players